Erick Simpson is an American author who writes about the managed service provider field.

Early life and education
Born in California, United States, Simpson was educated at the Loara High School. For his further education, he attended California State University, Fullerton and received a degree in business administration.

Career
After his graduation, he worked at Dreyer's in peronnel department. Later, he founded a trucking company which he owned until 1991.

Simpson is the co-founder of SPC International, a company which sells training in IT business improvement.

Simpson created the MSP Mastered Methodology to enhance the productivity of managed service providers and co-founded one of the first pure play MSPs.

Awards and recognition
 SMB Nation's SMB Award
 Time ChannelPro 20/20 Visionaries
 Time MSP Mentor

Bibliography
 The Guide to a Successful Managed Services Practice (2006)

References 

Information technology education
Year of birth missing (living people)
Living people